Aïn Fekan District is a district of Mascara Province, Algeria.

Municipalities
The district is further divided into 2 municipalities:
Aïn Fekan
Aïn Fras

Districts of Mascara Province